Tracy Unified School District is a public school district in Tracy, California, United States. As of 2006-07, there were 23 schools in the district.

Schools

High schools
John C. Kimball High School
Tracy High School
Merrill F. West High School

K-8 schools
Freiler School
George Kelly School
North School
Poet-Christian School

Middle schools
Monte Vista Middle School
Earle E. Williams Middle School

Elementary schools
Bohn Elementary School
Central Elementary School
Hirsch Elementary School
Mellville S. Jacobson Elementary School
McKinley Elementary School
South/West Park Elementary School
Villalovoz Elementary School

Alternative schools
George and Evelyn Stein Continuation High School
Duncan-Russell Continuation High School
S.T.E.P.S. (9-12)
Tracy Adult School
Willow Community Day School (7-11)

Charter schools
Tracy Learning Center (K-12)

References

External links
 

School districts in San Joaquin County, California
Tracy, California